Carroll Timothy O'Meara (April 22, 1943 - May 16, 2007) was an American film editor. He was nominated for an Academy Award in the category Best Film Editing for the film The Rose. O'Meara also won an Primetime Emmy Award. He died in May 2007 at his home in Chatsworth, California, at the age of 64.

Selected filmography 
 The Rose (1979; co-nominated with Robert L. Wolfe)

References

External links 

1943 births
2007 deaths
People from Sherman Oaks, Los Angeles
American film editors
Primetime Emmy Award winners